Lawrence Levy may refer to:
 Lawrence H. Levy, American television writer and producer
 Lawrence C. Levy, journalist and professor

See also
 Laurence Levy (1921–2007), neurosurgeon